No Time may refer to:

 No Time (EP), by Defiance, or the title song, 1997
 "No Time" (Frente! song), 1993
 "No Time" (The Guess Who song), 1969
 "No Time" (Just Jack song), 2007
 "No Time" (KSI song), 2021
 "No Time" (Lil' Kim song), 1996
 "No Time" (Mondo Rock song), 1982
 "No Time" (Serebro song), 2010
 "No Time" (Whiteout song), 1994
 "No Time", a song by the Hootenanny Singers, 1966
 "No Time", a song by Late of the Pier from Fantasy Black Channel, 2008
 "No Time", a song by Mark Stoermer from Another Life, 2011
 "No Time", a song by the Monkees from Headquarters, 1967
 "No Time", a song by the Move from Message from the Country, 1971
 "No Time", a song by Nav from Brown Boy 2, 2020